South Road and its southern section as Main South Road outside of Adelaide is a major north–south conduit connecting Adelaide and the Fleurieu Peninsula, in South Australia. It is one of Adelaide's most important arterial and bypass roads. As South Road, it is designated part of route A2 within suburban Adelaide. As Main South Road, it is designated part of routes A13 and B23.

The northern part of South Road contributes the central component of the North–South Corridor, a series of road projects under construction or planning that will eventually provide a continuous expressway between Old Noarlunga and Gawler.

Route
South Road starts at the intersection of the Port River Expressway and the Salisbury Highway in Wingfield. It runs directly south, through much of Adelaide's inner western suburbs, close to the Adelaide city centre. It is complimented by, and in some instances, subsumed into the North-South Motorway. It either runs directly underneath it at ground level with the motorway above it on elevated carriageways, or straddles it on each side with the motorway lowered into a trench. 

The motorway currently ends in Hindmarsh just south of the intersections with Port Road and Grange Road. South Road then becomes the main traffic route southwards. 

South Road continues south through Mile End and Edwardstown until St Marys, where the Southern Expressway starts in a lowered trench. South Road straddles it on each side, until it reaches the intersection of Ayliffes and Shepherds Hill Roads at Tonsley, South Australia, where it changes name to Main South Road. It continues through Old Noarlunga (where Victor Harbor Road branches off) and runs parallel to the coastline of Gulf St Vincent. At Normanville, it is known as Willis Drive for 2 km, then continues to Cape Jervis at its southern tip.

The Southern Expressway runs roughly parallel to Main South Road for 18 km between Darlington and Noarlunga and serves to reduce traffic congestion. Main South Road and the Southern Expressway have 3 different intersections along the length of the roads.

History
The first reference to South Road was made in 1842. The South Australian Gazette referred to sheep stations near the corner of South Road and Sturt Road, in what is now Bedford Park.

South Road of today was until the 1970s known by a string of names: Shillabeer Avenue (from what was then its northern terminus at Regency Road to Torrens Road); Government Road (between Torrens and Port Roads); John Street (Port to Grange Roads); Taylors Road (between Grange and Henley Beach Roads); Fisher Terrace (Henley Beach Road to Anzac Highway), and South Road from Anzac Highway southwards.

The town of Old Reynella was bypassed in 1964. Old Noarlunga was bypassed in 1972.

The South Road Extension was built at Dry Creek in the early 1990s, connecting South Road and the Salisbury Highway, between Grand Junction Road and Port Wakefield Road. This was superseded by the Port River Expressway, which opened in 2005.

Congestion and upgrades

South Road suffers from traffic congestion due to its importance as one of Adelaide's main arterial roads and bypasses. Traffic has also increased in line with the growth and development of Adelaide's southern suburbs.

Between 1982 and 1984, an overpass was built at Emerson Crossing, taking South Road over Cross Road and the Seaford railway line. For a long time, this was the only grade separation on South Road, and one of very few in South Australia, removing congestion with Cross Road traffic and the railway line. However, increasing frequency of commuter trains results in vehicle bottlenecks that are anticipated to worsen. Queues on the exit ramps to Cross Road can extend into the through lanes on South Road. The rail crossing can be closed for up to 20 minutes in the peak hour.

In November 2005, the Royal Automobile Association (RAA) released its recommendations to the South Australian government in regards to the road network. South Road was found to be the poorest road in the state, registering a 2/10 on the RAA's scale. The recommendations given included $6 billion of funds to upgrade the roads of South Australia – with $1.5–2 billion to be spent on South Road alone. The RAA's plan for the road included a 6 km tunnel from Port Road all the way to the Anzac Highway underpass. The plan called for over/underpasses at six other major intersections and two rail crossings.

In 2005, along with the decision to make a free flowing South Road, a decision was made to build an underpass for South Road to go under Anzac Highway. Named the Gallipoli Underpass in line with the ANZAC theme, construction started in 2007. The underpass opened in March 2009. To cut down on delays due to construction, an overpass was built at the same time for the Glenelg tram line just half a kilometre to the south, which opened in 2009, significantly removing delays from the area.

In August 2007, Prime Minister John Howard announced that South Road was to be included in the AusLink National Road Network, and pledged $1 billion in funding for the project between 2007 and 2020.

North–South Motorway

The North–South Motorway is an incomplete motorway intended to replace South Road as Adelaide's primary north–south roadway. Running along the same road corridor as South Road and extending further north, the motorway has been progressively constructed in stages. As of November 2020, approximately 22 km of the total 35 km length has been completed.

The first section of the motorway, known as the South Road Superway, was announced in October 2009. It is 3–4 km of elevated motorway running from the Port River Expressway to the intersection with Regency Road. The project started in 2010 and was completed in early 2014. 

Following the 2013 Australian federal election, the section of South Road between Torrens Road and the River Torrens was identified and funded for an upgrade. 4 km of lowered motorway was built between the northbound and southbound lanes of South Road. The Torrens to Torrens lowered motorway started construction in 2015 and opened to traffic in 2018. The project included replacing a level crossing of the Outer Harbor railway line, with a new bridge in 2017. 

The Darlington Upgrade, an extension of the Southern Expressway through Bedford Park by use of a similar lowered motorway concept, was also identified at this time. Both of these upgrades involved land acquisition to widen the road corridor, surface grade local carriage ways on the edges, and a lowered central roadway carrying the free-flow traffic below the crossing routes. The Darlington Upgrade began construction in 2016 and was opened in 2020.

An upgrade of Regency Road to Pym Street, the gap between the elevated South Road Superway and the (then) almost-completed Torrens to Torrens lowered motorway, was announced in May 2018, to be jointly funded by the state and federal governments. Main construction began in late 2019. The overpass opened at reduced speeds in March 2021. 

Preliminary plans for the final section stretching from the River Torrens to Darlington, which would use a combination of deep-bored tunnels, lowered motorway and surface-level motorway, were announced in late 2020 and are still under investigation.

Major intersections

Gallery

See also

 Highways in Australia
 List of highways in South Australia
 Metropolitan Adelaide Transport Study

References

Roads in Adelaide
Freeways and highways in Adelaide